"Last Resort" is the debut single by American rock band Papa Roach. The song first appeared on the soundtrack to the 2000 film Ready to Rumble and appeared on Papa Roach's second studio album, Infest, shortly after. "Last Resort" was released as the album's lead single on March 7, 2000, and reached number 57 on the US Billboard Hot 100 in December 2000. It also topped the Billboard Modern Rock Tracks chart for seven weeks and became a top-10 hit in Austria, Germany, Portugal, and the United Kingdom.

Music, background and lyrics
Described as nu metal, rap metal, alternative metal and hard rock the song "Last Resort" is about suicide. In an interview with Songfacts, Papa Roach member Tobin Esperance spoke about the song and its lyrics, saying:  Papa Roach vocalist Jacoby Shaddix described the song as a "cry for help". He also said "That song was about one of my best friends, and then 12–13 years later, that song was about me. I found myself in that place, where I was like, 'I can't go on this way. I can't do it anymore. Shaddix said that "Last Resort" is about a roommate he had who tried to commit suicide. Shaddix then said: "We caught him and took him to the hospital and he went into a mental facility and then he came out the other side better. He actually found God through the process, which was kind of crazy. So he's on a whole different path of his life now, which is cool. I'm really proud of him for the changes he's made in his life." 

"Last Resort" is influenced by hip hop music. Both The Fugees and Wu-Tang Clan influenced the song. Although the song does not feature piano, the song was composed with piano. Bassist Tobin Esperance said: "I've written songs on piano – actually, 'Last Resort' with that whole little riff/melody thing, that's done on the piano. And then I just transferred it to the guitar." Speaking about the making of and inspiration behind the song, Esperance said:

Commercial performance
"Last Resort" achieved mainstream success, peaking at number one on the US Billboard Modern Rock Tracks chart in August 2000 and number 57 on the Billboard Hot 100 in December 2000. The popularity of "Last Resort" helped Papa Roach's album Infest get certified 3× Platinum by the Recording Industry Association of America (RIAA) in July 2001.

Music video
The music video was directed by Marcos Siega. In the music video, the band performs on a floor surrounded by fans. Throughout the video, the camera zooms in on some fans near the stage and shows them in places that appear to be their rooms. In their rooms, they appear to be possibly depressed. Though it had apparently been claimed that this is meant to show how people might not look depressed but still are, the purpose was more so to show the people being taken from where they did not want to be to where they didfrom lonely despair to the rock show where they could have fun with their friends. There are many posters for radio station 98 Rock. This is the rock station out of Sacramento, California, that the band credits for jump starting their career. Inside the Infest album booklet are thanks to DJs of the radio station. About five hundred people, including local fans, came to the shooting of the music video for "Last Resort".

On the MuchMusic versionwhich utilizes the radio editthe word "fuck" is completely removed with no replacement. On the MTV and Vevo version, the words "cut", "bleeding", "die", "life" (from the line "if I took my life tonight"), and "suicide" were also muted. After original airings of the video on television, some networks went so far as to additionally censor words such as "suffocation", and even the title of the song itself.

Track listings

Charts and certifications

Weekly charts

Year-end charts

Certifications and sales

Release history

References

2000 songs
2000 debut singles
Censorship of music
DreamWorks Records singles
Music videos directed by Marcos Siega
Papa Roach songs
Songs about suicide
Songs written by Jacoby Shaddix
Songs written by Tobin Esperance